Fire Protection Fluid is a fluid that acts like water, looks like water, and flows like water, but does not get things wet in the same way as water.  When discharged from a fire apparatus, it converts to a gas, due to its thermodynamic properties and suppresses fire when used at its extinguishing concentration to remove heat.  It is often used to extinguish fires as part of automatic fire suppression systems, especially in facilities housing electronic equipment and will not damage electronics in the way that water will.

Firefighting equipment